The 2022 Pendle Borough Council election took place on 5 May 2022 to elect a third of Pendle Borough Council for the Borough of Pendle in England. This was on the same day as other English local elections. Twelve seats across ten wards were up for election.

The election resulted in the Conservatives maintaining control but with a reduced majority.

Ward Results
Incumbent Councillors denoted by an asterisk (*).

Barnoldswick

Barrowford and Pendleside

Boulsworth and Foulridge

Bradley

Brierfield East and Clover Hill

Earby and Coates

Marsden and Southfield

Vivary Bridge

Waterside and Horsfield

Whitefield and Walverden

Barrowford and Pendleside By-Election
Following the death of Councillor Carlo Lionti (elected 2021), a by-election was held in the Barrowford and Pendleside ward on the 15th December 2022. The winner will serve a 6 month term expiring at the 2023 council election.

References

2022
2020s in Lancashire
Pendle
May 2022 events in the United Kingdom